Fernando Namora (15 April 1919 – 31 January 1989), with the full name Fernando Gonçalves Namora was a Portuguese writer and medical doctor. Namora was born in Condeixa-a-Nova, Coimbra District and died in Lisbon, Portugal.

He received his medical degree at 1942, by the University of Coimbra. Those years as student would have influenced him as a man (and writer) as well his experience as a country doctor, in remote regions as Beira Baixa and Alentejo, till the year of 1950, when he moved to Lisbon, invited to be medical assistant at the Instituto Português de Oncologia.

His early book was Relevos, poetry, in (1937), published at the age of 18. In (1938) appeared his first romance As Sete Partidas do Mundo that won the Almeida Garrett Prize, and, three years later, with some other colleagues at Coimbra, was involved in the literary project of Novo Cancioneiro, (1941), with 10 volumes, which the first one was his poem named Terra - for many specialists the advent of neorealism  movement, a milestone in the Portuguese literature.  All the early age lyrics are in the anthology As Frias Madrugadas, by 1959. Nevertheless, his youth, Coimbra's student atmosphere romance is Fogo na Noite Escura (1943), at the collection Novos Prosadores (1943),  by Coimbra Editora.

Besides over 30 titles, along his fifty years of intensive literary life, not only wrote “neo-realistic” novels, as Casa da Malta (1945), Minas de S. Francisco (1946), Retalhos da Vida de um Médico (1949 and 1963), A Noite e a Madrugada (1950), O Trigo e o Joio (1954), but also “urban themes”,  contemporary fiction, as in O Homem Disfarçado (1957), Cidade Solitária (1959), Domingo à Tarde (1961, José Lins do Rego Prize), Os Clandestinos (1972), Resposta a Matilde (1980)  or O Rio Triste (1982, Fernando Chinaglia Prize, Fialho de Almeida Prize and D. Dinis Prize). Another cycle was the cadernos de um escritor narratives, a sort of analytic, critic testimonials, regarding “social themes” and the emergence of a new time, specially during the 1960s and 1970s, related with the Geneve International Encounters and the many travels abroad (including Scandinavia), expressed in Diálogo em Setembro (1966), Um Sino na Montanha (1968), Os Adoradores do Sol (1971), Estamos no Vento (1974), A Nave de Pedra (1975), Cavalgada Cinzenta (1977), URSS, Mal Amada, Bem Amada and Sentados na Relva, from (1986).

Namora was suggested for the Nobel Prize in 1981.

Works 

 As Sete Partidas do Mundo, romance – 1938
 Fogo na Noite Escura, romance – 1943
 Casa da Malta, romance – 1945
 Minas de San Francisco,'romance – 1946
 Retalhos da Vida de um Médico, narratives / first part – 1949
 A Noite e a Madrugada, romance – 1950
 Deuses e Demónios da Medicina, biografies – 1952
 O Trigo e o Joio, romance – 1954
 O Homem Disfarçado, romance – 1957
 Cidade Solitária, narrative – 1959
 As Frias Madrugadas, poems – 1959
 Domingo à Tarde, romance – 1961
 Retalhos da Vida de um Médico, narratives / second part – 1963
 Diálogo em Setembro, romanced chronicle – 1966
 Um Sino na Montanha, writer caderns – 1968
 Marketing, poesia – 1969
 Os Adoradores do Sol, writer caderns – 1971
 Os Clandestinos, romance – 1972
 Estamos no Vento, literary-sociologic narrative – 1974
 A Nave de Pedra, writer caderns  – 1975
 Cavalgada Cinzenta, narrative – 1977
 Encontros, interviews – 1979
 Resposta a Matilde, divertimento – 1980
 O Rio Triste, romance – 1982
 Nome para uma Casa, poems – 1984
 URSS mal amada, bem amada, chronicle – 1986
 Sentados na Relva, writer caderns – 1986
 Jornal sem Data, writer caderns – 1988

References

External links 

1919 births
1989 deaths
People from Condeixa-a-Nova
Portuguese male novelists
Portuguese medical writers
20th-century novelists
20th-century Portuguese writers
University of Coimbra alumni
20th-century male writers